Sir Siddappa Totappa Kambli (born 1882) was an Indian politician from Hubli.

Kambli was a member of the Bombay Legislative Council and was elected as its Deputy President. Under the system of dyarchy, he served as a minister of agriculture from 1930 to 1934 and minister of education from 1932 to 1937. After the provincial elections of 1937, a government was formed under Dhanjishah Cooper where Kambli was made minister for Education, Excise & Agriculture. As a minister of education, Kambli was responsible for the establishment of Karnatak University in Dharwad.

After independence of India, Kambli joined the Kisan Mazdoor Praja Party. He also played a role in the unification of Karnataka.

References

1882 births
Year of death missing
People from Hubli
Karnataka local politicians
Knights Bachelor
Indian Knights Bachelor
Karnataka politicians
Kisan Mazdoor Praja Party politicians
Politicians from British India